Gorokhov (from горох meaning peas) is a Russian masculine surname, its feminine counterpart is Gorokhova. It may refer to:

Alexei Gorokhov (1927–1999), Soviet violinist
Andrey Gorokhov — several people
Elena Gorokhova (1933–2014), Russian painter
Galina Gorokhova (born 1938), Russian fencer
Georgiy Gorokhov (born 1993), Russian pole vaulter
Igor Gorokhov (born 1990), Russian ice hockey defenceman 
Ilya Gorokhov (born 1977), Russian ice hockey defenceman
Ivan Gorokhov (painter) (1863-1934), Russian painter
Leonid Gorokhov (born 1967), Russian cellist 
Sergei Gorokhov (born 1981), Russian football player
Vladimir Gorokhov (1911–1985), Soviet football player and coach

See also
 Horokhiv

Russian-language surnames